

Events

January
  January 4 – The Island Line, Isle of Wight temporarily closes for renovations and Class 483 units are withdrawn from service. The cars originally operated on the London Underground starting in 1938.
 January 22 – Opening of the full Beijing–Shenyang high-speed railway.

February
  February 7 – Transport for Wales Rail takes over the Wales & Borders franchise from KeolisAmey Wales.
  February 27 – Metrorrey Line 3 commences operation in Monterrey, Mexico.

March
  March 4 – Opening of  stretch of North-South Railway.
  March 26 – Sohag train collision

April
 April 1 – The Moscow Metro Bolshaya Koltsevaya line is extended to Mnyovniki.
 April 2 – Hualien train derailment
 April 6 – The Te Huia passenger service between Hamilton and Papakuri begins, including the opening of a new transit hub in Hamilton.
 April 10 – The Île-de-France tramway Line 9 opens.
  April 18 – Toukh train accident
  April 25 – Taichung Metro's Green Line commences operation in Taichung. The line had opened the previous November, but was shut down for repairs after trains exhibited faulty couplers.

May
  May 3 – Mexico City Metro overpass collapse
  May 6 – Flixtrain begins operating long-distance passenger services from Stockholm to Gothenburg.
  May 10 – SNCF open-access operator Ouigo España begins low-cost high-speed rail passenger services over the Madrid–Barcelona high-speed rail line.
  May 24 – Kelana Jaya LRT collision

June
  June 7 – 2021 Ghotki train collision: The Millat Express from Karachi derails near Daharki in Sindh province and the Sir Syed Express coming in the opposite direction collides with it and overturns, killing at least 50.
  June 23 – Renfe begins Avlo low-cost high-speed rail passenger services over the Madrid–Barcelona high-speed rail line.
 June 25
  – Lhasa-Nyingchi Railway, Xiamen Metro Line 3 begins operation.
  – The first phase of Jiaxing Tram begins operation.
  June 26 – Zhengzhou Metro Line 3 Extension begins operation.
  June 27 – The Tuen Ma Line  fully opens, with a new section between Hung Hom and Kai Tak.
  June 28 – Mianyang–Luzhou high-speed railway (Neijiang-Zigong-Luzhou section), Hangzhou Metro Line 8, Hangzhou–Haining intercity railway, Shaoxing Metro Line 1 (Keqiao–Guniangqiao section), Changzhou Metro Line 2, Xuzhou Metro Line 3 begins operation.
  June 29 – Xi'an Metro Line 14 begins operation and merges with the former Airport Intercity Line; Suzhou Rail Transit Line 5 begins operation.
  June 30 – Metro Express (Mauritius) extended by 2 stations (Phase 2A).

July
  July 5 – Manila LRT Line 2 East Extension opens.
  July 20 – 2021 Henan floods overwhelm part of Zhengzhou Metro Line 5, killing 14.

August
  August 2 – SRT Dark Red Line of Bangkok suburban railway system begins operation.
  August 4 – Milavče train crash
  August 6 – The final section of the Delhi Metro Pink Line between Trilokpuri Sanjay Lake and Mayur Vihar Pocket I opens after being previously delayed due to land acquisition and rehabilitation issues.
  August 9 – The Tampere light rail system begins operation with Lines 1 and 3.
  August 18 – The initial section of Foshan Nanhai Tram Line 1 opened.
  August 26 – Line 7 and Batong line of Beijing Subway extended to  station.
  August 28 – Thomson–East Coast MRT line Stage 2 opens.
  August 29 – Through operation of Line 1 and Batong line of Beijing Subway started.

  August 30 – Opening of the Center City Corridor expansion of LYNX streetcar service in Charlotte, North Carolina.

September
  September 20 – Opening of the Northern line extension to Battersea in London.
  September 25 – Montana train derailment

October
  October 2 – Opening of the Northgate Link extension in Seattle.
  October 25 – Opening of the T3 line of AntRay tram in Antalya between Varsak and Müze stations.
  October 31 – Salisbury rail crash

November

  November 1 – The Island Line, Isle of Wight recommenced service after upgrades and began using Class 484 units.
  November 6 –  Opening of Hanoi Metro. The first line 2A (Cat Linh Line) started to operate.
  November 18 – Amtrak Cascades service restarts over the Point Defiance Bypass. The rail line was closed in 2017 after the service's inaugural run through the corridor resulted in a derailment.
  November 20 – Regular scheduled passenger services recommence on the Dartmoor Line between Crediton and Okehampton.
 November 21
 – The Mid-Coast Trolley extension of the San Diego Trolley Blue Line opens for service in San Diego, California.
 – The Philippine National Railways' first standard-gauge electric multiple unit stock for the North–South Commuter Railway was delivered.

December
 December 3
  – Boten–Vientiane railway opens.
  – Yuxi–Mohan railway opens.
  December 7 – 10 stations of the Bolshaya Koltsevaya line  of the Moscow Metro, between Mnyovniki and Kakhovskaya, open.
  December 11 – Karlsruhe Stadtbahn city centre tunnel opened.
  December 16 – Kaohsiung begins trial run of the section between Gushan District Office and TRA Museum of Fine Arts stations on the Circular light rail.
  December 17 – São Paulo Metro Line 4 extension to Vila Sônia opens.
  December 27 – TER Dakar phase 1 opening.
 December 28
  – The inaugural section of Kanpur Metro with nine stations opened.
  – Opening of the Nanjing Metro Line S6, and the west extension of Line 2.
  December 29 –  Opening of São Paulo Metro Line 15 extension to Jardim Colonial.
  December 31 – Opening of Line 11, Line 17, Line 19; extensions of Capital Airport Express, Changping line, Line S1, Line 16; and the central sections of Line 8 and Line 14 of Beijing Subway.

Industry awards

Japan
 Awards presented by Japan Railfan Club
 2021 Blue Ribbon Award: Kintetsu 80000 series Hinotori EMU, Kintetsu
 2021 Laurel Prize: E261 series EMU JR East, N700S Series Shinkansen JR Central

North America
 Awards presented by Railway Age magazine
 2021 Railroader of the Year: Keith Creel (CP)

References